The canton of Bar-sur-Seine is an administrative division of the Aube department, northeastern France. Its borders were modified at the French canton reorganisation which came into effect in March 2015. Its seat is in Bar-sur-Seine.

It consists of the following communes:
 
Bar-sur-Seine
Bertignolles
Bourguignons
Briel-sur-Barse
Buxeuil
Buxières-sur-Arce
Celles-sur-Ource
Chacenay
Chappes
Chauffour-lès-Bailly
Chervey
Courtenot
Courteron
Cunfin
Éguilly-sous-Bois
Essoyes
Fontette
Fouchères
Fralignes
Gyé-sur-Seine
Jully-sur-Sarce
Landreville
Loches-sur-Ource
Magnant
Marolles-lès-Bailly
Merrey-sur-Arce
Mussy-sur-Seine
Neuville-sur-Seine
Noé-les-Mallets
Plaines-Saint-Lange
Poligny
Polisot
Polisy
Rumilly-lès-Vaudes
Saint-Parres-lès-Vaudes
Saint-Usage
Thieffrain
Vaudes
Verpillières-sur-Ource
Villemorien
Villemoyenne
Ville-sur-Arce
Villy-en-Trodes
Virey-sous-Bar
Vitry-le-Croisé
Viviers-sur-Artaut

References

Cantons of Aube